Bulldog Park is a baseball stadium in Indianapolis, Indiana. It hosts the Butler University Bulldogs college baseball team.  The stadium holds 500 people.

History
Originally designed as a multi-use facility for both the football and baseball teams, it was converted into a baseball-only facility during the mid-90s. Several basic renovations have occurred during the facilities existence, including but not limited to: the installation of a permanent outfield fence, bleachers, dugouts and a press box. Major upgrades to the facility in 2011 include, but are not limited to: a brick wall behind home plate, professional-style netting behind home plate and a backstop to replace the chain-link fence. Also, ground-level bench seating and walk-in dugouts were added to the facility.

Features
The facility has a clubhouse and locker room, concrete patio, engraved donor walk area, concessions and restrooms.

See also
 Butler Bulldogs baseball

References

External links
 Official Website

College baseball venues in the United States
Butler Bulldogs baseball
Sports venues in Indianapolis
Baseball venues in Indiana